The 1992–1993 Iowa Hawkeyes women's basketball team represented the University of Iowa in the 1992–1993 NCAA women's basketball season. The Hawkeyes, led by tenth-year head coach C. Vivian Stringer, played their home games in Iowa City, IA at Carver–Hawkeye Arena as members of the Big Ten Conference. They finished the season 27–4 overall, 16–2 in Big Ten play, sharing the regular season conference championship. The team was the first Iowa Hawkeyes women's basketball team to advance to the Final Four in the women's NCAA basketball tournament.

Roster

Coaching Staff 
Head Coach: C. Vivian Stringer

Assistant Coaches: Marianna Freeman, Angie Lee, Linda Myers

Game Results

References 

Iowa
Iowa Hawkeyes women's basketball seasons
Iowa Hawkeyes
Iowa Hawkeyes
Iowa
NCAA Division I women's basketball tournament Final Four seasons